MORC family CW-type zinc finger protein 2 is a protein that in humans is encoded by the MORC2 gene.

References

Further reading